Thomas Hefferon (born 3 January 1982 in London, United Kingdom) is an Irish filmmaker and music video director based in Dublin, Ireland.

Since 2004 he has worked on a variety of film projects as a co-writer, producer and camera person. He also writes and develops his own scripts, the latest of which has been selected for state funding (see The Pool, below). In January 2009 he shot the music video for JJ Daly's Playing The Game, which was followed by the nationwide release of the single, also available on iTunes.

Hefferon moved to dublin in 1989, after finishing school in 2000, he attended the Film Foundation Course run by Filmbase, in Temple Bar, Dublin.

Filmography
Loose Change (2006)
The Psychologist (2006)
The Confession (2008)
The Pool (in production)

References

External links

Irish film directors
Living people
1982 births